Zadní Chodov is a municipality and village in Tachov District in the Plzeň Region of the Czech Republic. It has about 200 inhabitants.

Administrative parts
The village of Kyjov is an administrative part of Zadní Chodov.

References

Villages in Tachov District